Earl Evans Jr. (June 20, 1906 - October 1976)  was an American Democratic politician and public official in Mississippi. He served in the Mississippi Senate including as President Pro Tempore. He served in the Mississippi Senate in the 1940s and 1950s. He had been a special agent with the FBI. He lived in Canton, Mississippi and represented Madison County, Mississippi. He was also a businessman and farmer. He married.

A staunch segregationist, he was a leader in the "states rights" movement. He served on the segregationist Legal Educational Advisory Committee (LEAC) and the Mississippi State Sovereignty Commission that worked to thwart civil rights campaigning and preserve segregation.

References

1906 births
1976 deaths
20th-century American politicians
Democratic Party Mississippi state senators
People from Canton, Mississippi